Psilocybe silvatica  is a psilocybin mushroom in the section Semilanceatae of the genus Psilocybe. Psilocybin is the main active compound. The species is closely related to its European twin Psilocybe medullosa, which differs genetically, and the American Psilocybe pelliculosa, which can be distinguished by spore size and cheilocystidia shape.

Cap: ¼"-13/16" broadly conic to bell shaped, and often with an acute reddish brown umbo. Tawny dark brown when moist, fading to pale yellow brown or gray brown and a striate margin. Surface smooth, viscid when moist from a thin gelatinous pellicle that is barely separable, if at all.

Gills: narrowly to broadly attached, close or slightly wider spacing, grayish brown to cinnamon brown and smoky brown at maturity with white gill edges.

Stem: ¾" - 3 3/16" tall 1/32-⅛" thick, equal to slightly enlarged at the base, brittle, tubular, and somewhat twisted. Pale to brownish under a whitish fibrillose covering. Partial veil is cortinate, thin to obscure, and soon absent. Shimmery off-white rather flexible stem stains yellowish-brown to deep burgundy-brown sometimes bruising blue where handled.

Spores: purple-brown, sub-rhomboid with a germ pore, 6-9.5x4-5.5 µm

Habitat:solitary or scattered on wood debris or wood chips or on well decayed conifer. medium elevation moist, partially-shaded woods predominantly beech, birch and maple from a mixed woody debris beneath live feather moss layer or from loose soil sometimes fruiting in clear cuts with Psilocybe pelliculosa.

Microscopic features: 4 spored and occasionally 2 spored basidia, cheilocystidia 24-40 × 4.4-8.8 µm enlarged in the middle and tapered to both ends or flask shaped, with a long flexuous neck, 1.6-2.2 µm thick.

Taxonomy
The fungus was first described by American mycologist Charles Horton Peck in 1889 as Psathyra silvatica. Rolf Singer and Alexander H. Smith transferred it to Psilocybe in 1958.

References

Entheogens
Psychoactive fungi
silvatica
Psychedelic tryptamine carriers
Fungi described in 1889
Fungi of North America